The Lincoln Center Historic District is a historic district on Bedford, Lincoln, Old Lexington, Sandy Pond, Trapelo & Weston Roads in Lincoln, Massachusetts. The district encompasses Lincoln's civic heart, consisting of a traditional New England Meeting House, a Late Victorian church and the Lincoln Public Library, and a Georgian Revival town hall, as well as a cluster of residences dating to the mid-18th century, when Lincoln was established as a town separate from its neighbors.

The district was added to the National Register of Historic Places in 1985.

See also
National Register of Historic Places listings in Middlesex County, Massachusetts

References

Buildings and structures in Lincoln, Massachusetts
Historic districts in Middlesex County, Massachusetts
National Register of Historic Places in Middlesex County, Massachusetts
Historic districts on the National Register of Historic Places in Massachusetts